Vendetta is a 1990 novel by Michael Dibdin, and is the second book in the popular Aurelio Zen series.

Zen has earned a return to the fold of actual police work, but now officials in a high government ministry are desperate to finger someone—anyone—for the murder of an eccentric billionaire, whose corrupt dealings have enriched some of the most exalted figures in Italian politics. However, Oscar Burolo's murder would seem to be not just unsolvable but impossible. The magnate was killed on a heavily fortified Sardinian estate, where every room was monitored by video cameras. Those cameras captured Burolo's grisly death, but not the face of his killer.

Zen grapples, in his idiosyncratic fashion, with this apparent "locked door" mystery by launching an ill-advised solo undercover investigation, amongst the fallout from which he is confronted by an almost forgotten face from the past, who now stalks him with vengeful intent.

TV adaptation
The novel was adapted for television by the BBC, starring Rufus Sewell in the title role. It was aired in January 2011.

External links
BBC Programme page: Zen - Vendetta 

1990 British novels
Novels by Michael Dibdin
Novels set in Italy
Faber and Faber books